My Seditious Heart is a 2019 essay collection by Indian writer Arundhati Roy. It was published on 4 June 2019 by Penguin Random House.

Reception
The Telegraph wrote in a review "Roy’s 950-page tome is a sometimes lyrical, sometimes strident record of a country’s slide from a liberal secular centrist identity (albeit with a sliver of leftism/socialism) to a Hindu nation of capitalist inclination and extreme-right-wing faith."

The Guardian wrote in a review "Roy covers the aggressive appropriation of tribal rural lands for mining and water projects, the expansion of nuclear weapons programmes, the privatisation and commercialisation of Indian services, the legacies and continuation of colonisation and imperialism in various forms, government corruption, American warmongering and national hypocrisy."

References

Penguin Books India books
21st-century Indian books
Essay collections by Arundhati Roy
2019 non-fiction books